Monte Chiadenis (Friulian: Cjadenis) is a peak in the Carnic Alps, northern Italy, located between the comuni of Sappada and Forni Avoltri.

During World War I (1915–1917) it was the site of fierce fighting between Italian alpini and Austrian Kaiserjäger.

In Friulian language cjadenis means "chains".

See also
War of the Mountains 1915–1918

Mountains of the Alps
Mountains of Veneto
Mountains of Friuli-Venezia Giulia